Ilya Ivashka was the defending champion but chose not to defend his title.

Arthur Rinderknech won the title after defeating Benjamin Bonzi 4–6, 7–6(7–1), 7–6(7–3) in the final.

Seeds

Draw

Finals

Top half

Bottom half

References

External links
Main draw
Qualifying draw

Amex-Istanbul Challenger - 1
2021 1